Condyle of tibia may refer to:

 Lateral condyle of tibia
 Medial condyle of tibia